Molineidae is a family of nematodes belonging to the order Rhabditida.

Genera
Genera:
 Angulocirrus Biocca & Le Roux, 1957
 Anoplostrongylus Boulenger, 1926
 Asymmetracantha Mawson, 1960
 ???Bakeria Moravec & Sey, 1986
 Biacantha Wolfgang, 1954
 Bradypostrongylus Price, 1928
 Brevigraphidium Freitas & Mendonça, 1960
 Brygoonema Durette-Desset & Chabaud, 1981
 Caenostrongylus Lent & Freitas, 1938
 Carostrongylus Durette-Desset & Vaucher, 1989
 Cheiropteronema Sandground, 1929
 ???Delicata Travassos, 1935
 Dollfusstrongylus Quentin, 1970
 Dromaeostrongylus Lubimow, 1933
 Filicapitis Travassos, 1949
 Fontesia Travassos, 1928
 Graphidiops Lent & Freitas, 1938
 Hadrostrongylus Lux Hoppe & do Nascimento, 2007
 Hepatojarakus Yeh, 1955
 Histiostrongylus Molin, 1861
 Hugotnema Durette-Desset & Chabaud, 1981
 Johnpearsonia Durette-Desset, Ben Slimane, Cassone, Barton & Chabaud, 1994
 Kentropyxia Baker, 1982
 Lamanema Becklund, 1963
 Maciela Travassos, 1935
 Mackerrastrongylus Mawson, 1960
 Macuahuitloides Jiménez, Peralta-Rodríguez, Caspeta-Mandujano & Ramírez-Díaz, 2014
 Moennigia Travassos, 1935
 Molineus Cameron, 1923
 Molinostrongylus Skarbilovitch, 1934
 Molostrongylus Durette-Desset & Vaucher, 1996
 Murielus Dikmans, 1939
 Nematodirella Yorke & Maplestone, 1926
 Nematodiroides Bernard, 1965
 Nematodirus Ransom, 1907
 Neohistiostrongylus Barus & Valle, 1967
 Nochtia Travassos & Vogelsang, 1929
 Nycteridostrongylus Baylis, 1930
 Ollulanus Leuckart, 1865
 Ortleppstrongylus Durette-Desset, 1970
 Oswaldocruzia Travassos, 1917
 Paragraphidium Freitas & Mendonca, 1960
 Parahistiostrongylus Pérez Vigueras, 1940
 Pithecostrongylus Lubimov, 1930
 Poekilostrongylus Schmidt & Whittaker, 1975
 Ragenema Slimane, Chabaud & Durette-Desset, 1996
 Rauschia Durette-Desset, 1979
 Schulzia Travassos, 1937
 Shattuckius Sandground, 1938
 Spinostrongylus Travassos, 1935
 Sprattellus Durette-Desset & Cassone, 1981
 Tachynema Durette-Desset & Cassone, 1983
 Tadaridanema Falcón-Ordaz, Guzmán-Cornejo, García-Prieto & Gardner, 2006
 Tasmanema Durette-Desset & Cassone, 1983
 Tenuostrongylus Leroux, 1933
 Tetrabothriostrongylus Mawson, 1960
 Torrestrongylus Vigueras, 1935
 Trichochenia Kou, 1958
 Trichohelix Ortlepp, 1922
 Tricholeiperia Travassos, 1935
 Trichoskrjabinia Travassos, 1937
 Trifurcata Schulz, 1926
 Tupaiostrongylus Dunn, 1963
 Typhlopsia Barus & Coy Otero, 1978
 Zaglonema Durette-Desset & Beveridge, 1981

References

Nematodes